Light chain deposition disease (LCDD) is a rare blood cell disease which is characterized by deposition of fragments of infection-fighting immunoglobulins,  called light chains (LCs), in the body. LCs are normally cleared by the kidneys, but in LCDD, these light chain deposits damage organs and cause disease. The kidneys are almost always affected and this often leads to kidney failure.  About half of people with light chain deposition disease also have a plasma cell dyscrasia, a spectrum of diseases that includes multiple myeloma, Waldenström's macroglobulinemia, and the monoclonal gammopathy of undetermined significance premalignant stages of these two diseases.  Unlike in AL amyloidosis, in which light chains are laid down in characteristic amyloid deposits, in LCDD, light chains are deposited in non-amyloid granules.

Signs and symptoms

The kidney is the organ most frequently affected.  Proteinuria, the presence of protein in the urine, is characteristic. More than 90% of people with LCDD develop kidney failure, often with rapid progression of disease.

Light chains may be deposited in many other organs and may or may not result in any symptoms. Other than the kidneys, liver and heart are the most commonly involved organs.  Deposition of light chains in the liver may lead to hepatomegaly, an enlarged liver, or rarely portal hypertension or liver failure. The heart is affected in up to 80% of patients with LCDD, and may cause arrhythmias and congestive heart failure.

Cause

Diagnosis
A number of laboratory tests are required in order to assist in diagnosing LCDD. Blood and urine samples are collected for evaluation of kidney and liver function and determination of the presence of a monoclonal protein. Imaging studies such as echocardiography and an ultrasound of the abdomen will be performed. A CT scan, magnetic resonance imaging (MRI) or positron emission tomography (PET) may also be indicated. In patients with LCDD, a biopsy of the affected organ will show deposited light chains. A bone marrow biopsy will be done in order to rule out multiple myeloma.

Treatment
Decreasing production of the organ-damaging light chains is the treatment goal. Options include chemotherapy using bortezomib, autologous stem cell transplantation, immunomodulatory drugs, and kidney transplant. There is no standard treatment for LCDD. High-dose melphalan in conjunction with autologous stem cell transplantation has been used in some patients. A regimen of bortezomib and dexamethasone has also been examined.

Prognosis
The median time to progression to end stage renal disease is 2.7 years.  After 5 years, about 37% of patients with LCDD are alive and do not have end stage renal disease.

References

External links 
 National Institutes of Health Genetic and Rare Diseases Information Center
 Emedicine

Blood disorders